Folliculitis nares perforans is characterized by small pustules near the tip of the inside of the nose, lesions that become crusted, and when the crust is removed it is found that the bulbous end of the affected vibrissa is embedded in the inspissated material.

See also
Skin lesion

References

 
Conditions of the skin appendages